Hawthorne is located at 43°27'22"N 123°4'51"W (43.4562300, -123.0809000).

The Hawthorne District in Portland, Oregon, is an area of Southeast Portland on SE Hawthorne Blvd. that runs from 12th to 60th Avenues, with the primary core of businesses between 30th and 50th Avenues. The area has numerous retail stores, including clothing shops, restaurants, bars, brewpubs and microbreweries.

History

Hawthorne Boulevard was named after J.C. Hawthorne, the cofounder of Oregon's first mental hospital. Originally named "U" Street, the road was renamed Asylum Avenue in 1862.  In 1883 the privately owned Oregon Hospital for the Insane was replaced by a new state-run facility located in Salem, today's Oregon State Hospital. East Portland residents considered the continued use of the street name Asylum Avenue after the closure of hospital "distasteful." The name was abandoned in April 1888 when the street was renamed Hawthorne Avenue by city ordinance in honor of Hawthorne. It was renamed again in March 1933 to Hawthorne Boulevard.

Neighbors organized and prevented a McDonald's restaurant from being built at the site of a former Arby's restaurant. The vacant building was replaced with condominiums and retail shops on the first floor.

Area business association
The Hawthorne Boulevard Business Association serves local businesses on the boulevard from SE 12th Ave. through SE 60th Ave. While many Business Districts are intrinsically involved with their Neighborhood Association, this stretch of SE Hawthorne Blvd. is tangent to or a boundary of four neighborhoods Buckman, Hosford-Abernethy, Sunnyside, Richmond, and passes into a fifth, Mount Tabor.

Landmarks and recreation
Mt. Tabor Park has exceptional views of Portland, and is built on an extinct volcano.
The Bagdad Theater and Pub
Powell's City of Books, Hawthorne Branch
Western Seminary

Culture
A website that bills itself as "We are long time Portland locals on a mission: to promote our Portland neighborhoods and the independent businesses and artists that thrive in them." supposedly said Hawthorne is popular with different social groups, such as Generation X, hippies and more recently, hipsters. The Hawthorne area has vintage homes, apartments, and locally owned shops and restaurants.

See also
 Hawthorne Bridge
 Oregon Hospital for the Insane

References

External links

 Hawthorne Boulevard Business Association - Includes map of area and business information.

Buckman, Portland, Oregon
Hosford-Abernethy, Portland, Oregon
Mount Tabor, Portland, Oregon
Richmond, Portland, Oregon
Streetcar suburbs
Sunnyside, Portland, Oregon